Florian Hill (born April 9, 1984 in Germany) is a professional mountaineer and entrepreneur. 
He currently lives in New York City and Haines, Alaska.

Biography and athletic career
Hill was introduced to the mountains by his family early on in life. By the age of five, he had already climbed his first 10,000 foot mountain with his father in the Alps. In his late adolescence he competed in Olympic boxing in national and international tournaments, training at the Olympic Training Center in Germany. He was awarded Citizen of Honor in his hometown in the federal state of Hesse. Florian's passion for the outdoors led him to the Arctic where he trained sled dog teams for the longest and toughest distance race in the world e.g. for Yukon Quest winner and Iditarod veteran Sebastian Schnuelle in Canada and Alaska. As a professional mountaineer he extensively climbed in the ice-wastes of Alaska, the South American Andes, Himalaya, Kyrgyzstan, Burma, Central Asia and the Yukon Territory in Northern Canada. Florian Hill consistently strives to combine high performance and adventure.

Professional career
Florian Hill studied Business Psychology and completed the Aspen Leadership Program. In 2012, Hill founded a strategy consulting firm in New York and acted as a strategic adviser for European Horizons a transatlantic think tank based at Yale University in New Haven, Connecticut.

In 2015 he was officially announced as a fellow of Jonathan Edwards College at Yale University by a nomination of Professor master Laurans and the Council of Masters. He also functions as an honorary member to the German Council on Foreign Relations and the United Nations Association of the United States of America.

He is the founder and CEO of HILLWIRED Ltd. & Co KG, an international agency for strategic corporate communication, design, and creative technologies with project offices in Munich, New York, and Dublin.

Family 
Florian Hill is the first cousin of film director and Grimme prize-winner . His uncle Anton Hofherr is a German former professional ice hockey player.

Notable climbs 
 First ascent Djamila, Teke-Tor (4.480 m), Tian Shan, Kyrgyzstan, difficulty: V+, M4+, E4; 880 m
 First ascent Deliver Me, Illimani Southface (6.439 m), difficulty: VI, WI6, M6+, E5, alpine style; 1700 m.
 First ascent Chamaka, Sirk'i Qullu Southwest face (5.546 m) difficulty: VII, WI5, M5, alpine style; 550 m.
 First ascent Newfoundland, Diente Blanco (5.250 m), Kunturiri, Cordillera Real, difficulty V,WI5, M3+, alpine style; 420 m.
 First ascent "Epic", Taku D Peak, Southeast face, Juneau Icefield, Alaska. difficulty: TD-, E5, 550 Meter. Ski traverse and ascent by fair means
 Cerro Ramada Northwest face (6.384 m)
 Denali (6.194 m) 2011 West Buttress, 2012 West Rib, Messner couloir

References

External links 
 

German mountain climbers
Living people
1984 births